Showbiz Central is a Philippine television talk show broadcast by GMA Network. Originally hosted by Raymond Gutierrez, Pia Guanio and John Lapus, it premiered on April 29, 2007 replacing S-Files. The show concluded on July 29, 2012 with a total of 275 episodes. Gutierrez, Guanio, Lapus and Jennylyn Mercado served as the final hosts. It was replaced by H.O.T. TV: Hindi Ordinaryong Tsismis in its timeslot.

Segments
 MRT: Most Requested Talent
 Showbiz Central Live!
 Don't Lie to Me!
 Sweet Fire
 Central Map
 Correct or Reject
 The Story of Your Life
 Dateline SC
 The Killer Question: Seal it or Reveal it?
 Star Leveling
 Intriga Crossfire
 Ka-FaceMuk
 Be Scene

Hosts

Raymond Gutierrez 
Pia Guanio 
John Lapus 
Mo Twister 
Rufa Mae Quinto 
Jennylyn Mercado 

Recurring host
Jolina Magdangal

Ratings
According to AGB Nielsen Philippines' Mega Manila household television ratings, the final episode of Showbiz Central scored a 9.5% rating.

Accolades

References

External links
 

2007 Philippine television series debuts
2012 Philippine television series endings
Entertainment news shows in the Philippines
Filipino-language television shows
GMA Network original programming
Philippine television talk shows